John Thomas "Jack" Norris (20 March 1923 – 30 April 2015) was an Australian rules footballer who played with North Melbourne in the Victorian Football League (VFL).

Notes

External links 

1923 births
Australian rules footballers from Victoria (Australia)
North Melbourne Football Club players
Casterton Football Club players
2015 deaths